Howard Dickson Taylor (March 8, 1878 – September 14, 1944) was an American politician in the state of Washington. He served in the Washington House of Representatives and Washington State Senate.  From 1911 to 1915, he was Speaker of the Washington House.

References

1878 births
1944 deaths
Republican Party members of the Washington House of Representatives
Republican Party Washington (state) state senators